Xanthophyllum nigricans is a tree in the family Polygalaceae. The specific epithet  is from the Latin meaning "blackish", referring to the drying of plant parts.

Description
The smooth bark is greyish or dark brown. The flowers are white, drying dark reddish.

Distribution and habitat
Xanthophyllum nigricans is endemic to Borneo. Its habitat is ridge and hillside forests from sea-level to  altitude.

References

nigricans
Endemic flora of Borneo
Trees of Borneo
Plants described in 1973